The Ash Street School is a historic schoolhouse in Manchester, New Hampshire. It has been listed on the National Register of Historic Places since 1975.  The school occupies the city block bounded by Ash, Bridge, Maple, and Pearl Streets.

Description
The school building is a French style Second Empire three story brick building.  Its windows are tall and narrow with rounded tops, and are slightly recessed from the facade in a square niche; the window niches on the second floor have a further decorative brickwork border on top.  The building's most prominent feature is its clock tower, which rises four stories, and is topped by a mansard roof.

Building of the  schoolhouse took place in 1872 and 1874. It was finally completed and dedicated in 1874. The Amoskeag Company paid only .04 cents per square foot for the empty lot back in 1869.

The building was designed by George W. Stevens, civil engineer for the Amoskeag Company. The foundation was built by Gilman H. Kendall, the walls and roof by Alpheus Gay and interior finish by Mead & Mason of Concord.

A model of the building won a gold medal for its innovative design at the Philadelphia Centennial Exposition in 1876. Each arm is aligned on the property so that each end faces one of the principal directions. All original classrooms (eight in total) had windows on three sides to assist in allowing light and adequate ventilation. The building was the first in the country with this design style.

The bell alone within the clock tower weighs .

The current owner, Nick Soggu, owner and founder of SilverTech, purchased the building for his corporation in November 2007.

See also
National Register of Historic Places listings in Hillsborough County, New Hampshire

References

School buildings completed in 1874
Schools in Manchester, New Hampshire
School buildings on the National Register of Historic Places in New Hampshire
Former school buildings in the United States
Second Empire architecture in New Hampshire
National Register of Historic Places in Manchester, New Hampshire